Niata is a village and a former municipality in Laconia, Peloponnese, Greece. Since the 2011 local government reform, it is part of the municipality Evrotas, of which it is a municipal unit. The municipal unit has an area of 206.502 km2. Population 2,666 (2001). The seat of the municipality was in Agios Dimitrios. The municipal unit comprises the villages of Niata, Agios Dimitrios, Apidea, and Kremasti.

References

Populated places in Laconia